Tamigalesus munnaricus is a species of spider in the family Salticidae. It is found in India and Sri Lanka.

References 

Salticidae
Spiders described in 1988
Spiders of the Indian subcontinent
Arthropods of India
Arthropods of Sri Lanka